The 2012–13 Taça da Liga was the sixth edition of the Taça da Liga, the Portuguese football league cup competition. It was organized by the Portuguese League for Professional Football (LPFP) and contested between the 32 clubs competing in the 2012–13 Primeira Liga and 2012–13 Segunda Liga, the top two tiers of Portuguese football. The first matches were played on 28 July 2012, and the final was played on Estádio Cidade de Coimbra in Coimbra, on 13 April 2013.

Braga eliminated the holders and four-time winners Benfica in a penalty shootout in the semi-finals. In the final, they defeated Porto 1–0 to win their first title in the competition.

Format 
The competition format for the 2012–13 edition consists of three rounds plus a knockout phase. In the first round, only teams competing in the 2012–13 Segunda Liga (excluding reserve teams from Primeira Liga clubs) take part. The sixteen teams are drawn into four groups of four teams, where each team plays against the other three in a single round-robin format. The group winners and runners-up advance to the second round. 
In the second round, the eight teams that qualified from the previous round are joined by the six Primeira Liga teams placed 9th to 14th in the previous season and the two teams promoted to 2012–13 Primeira Liga. Two-legged home-and-away fixtures are played between Segunda Liga teams qualifying from the first round and Primeira Liga teams entering this round, and the winner advances to the third round.

The third round features the eight winners of the previous round the remaining eight Primeira Liga teams, ranked 1st to 8th in the previous season. Similarly to the first round, the sixteen teams are drawn into four groups of four teams, according to a seeding based on their classification in the previous season. Each team plays against the other three in a single round-robin format, and only the group winners advance to the knockout phase. The knockout phase consists of semi-finals and one final, both decided in one-legged fixtures. The final match is played at a neutral venue.

Teams 
The 32 teams competing in the two professional tiers of Portuguese football for the 2012–13 season are eligible to participate in this competition. For Primeira Liga teams, the final league position in the previous season determines if they enter in the second or third round of the Taça da Liga.

Key
Nth: League position in the 2011–12 season
P1: Promoted to the Primeira Liga
P2: Promoted to the Segunda Liga
R1: Relegated to the Segunda Liga

Notes
 Sporting da Covilhã finished 15th in the 2011–12 Segunda Liga, in position to be relegated to the Second Division for the 2012–13 season. However, as União de Leiria – which were relegated from the Primeira Liga, together with Feirense – were unable to fulfill the LPFP requirements mandatory for entry in professional competitions, they were further relegated to the Second Division and Covilhã was invited to take União de Leiria's place.
 Portimonense finished 16th (last) in the 2011–12 Segunda Liga, in position to be relegated to the Second Division for the 2012–13 season. However, as 2011–12 Second Division champions Varzim were unable to fulfill the LPFP requirements mandatory for entry in professional competitions, they were not promoted to the Segunda Liga, together with Tondela, and so Portimonense were invited to take Varzim's place.

Schedule 
All draws were held at the LPFP headquarters in Porto, except the draw for the first round, which was done at the Palácio do Freixo in Porto, during the draw ceremony for the LPFP competitions.

First round

Group A

Group B

Group C

Group D

Second round

Third round
The draw for the third round took place on 5 November 2012 at the LPFP headquarters in Porto. The third round group phase matches took place between December 2012 and January 2013.

Group A

Group B

Group C

Group D

Knockout phase

Semi-finals

Final

Statistics

Top goalscorers

References

External links
Official webpage 
Official regulation 
Official statistics 

2012-13
2012–13 European domestic association football cups
2012–13 in Portuguese football